Stara Zagora Airport  is the airport of the sixth largest city in Bulgaria, Stara Zagora.

Overview
The airport is located near the Kolio Ganchev suburb about 9 km south from the city center of Stara Zagora. Due to its good location, near Shipka Top and Sevtopolis, the airport is supposed to be mainly attractive for leisure charters. Stara Zagora Airport was awaiting concession procedure as of 2008 and is currently nonoperational.

See also 
 Kalvacha Airport
 List of airports in Bulgaria

References 

 Official source for citing population of Bulgarian cities, in Bulgarian
 Stara Zagora Airport resurrects
 Airport website
 Project

Defunct airports
Airports in Bulgaria
Buildings and structures in Stara Zagora
Stara Zagora